Ebenezer Ofori (born 1 July 1995) is a Ghanaian professional footballer who plays for Danish club Vejle Boldklub as a midfielder.

Club career

New Edubiase 
Ofori started his career in his native country Ghana, playing in the Ghana Premier League for Ashanti-based side New Edubiase United. He played 17 league matches and scored 4 goals in his debut top flight season. The club was entitled to a percentage on future transfers after selling him to AIK in 2013.

AIK 
In August 2013, Ofori joined Swedish side AIK on a three and half year deal. He was presented to the fans on 3 August 2013, at half-time during the club's 2–1 win over Elfsborg at the Friends Arena in the Allsvenskan. He made his debut for AIK against Manchester United in a friendly 2013. He made his official debut on 25 August 2018, playing the full 90 minutes in a 1–0 loss against Halmstad. During his first stint with the club he played 101 competition matches for AIK between 2013 and 2016.

VfB Stuttgart 
The Ghanaian midfielder completed his move to VfB Stuttgart in the 2. Bundesliga during the January transfer window on 31 January 2017, after the Africa Cup of Nations with the Black Stars. He helped Stuttgart to emerge champions of the German second-tier league and secure promotion back to the German top flight.

New York City 
On 21 February 2018, Ofori joined MLS side New York City FC on loan until the end of the 2018 MLS season. He played 28 league matches in his debut season. His loan was extended to continue for the 2019 MLS season. In the second season he played 20 league matches.

Return to AIK 
On 9 January 2020 it was announced that he will rejoin AIK for the 2020 Allsvenskan season on a permanent deal.

Vejle
On 13 January 2022, Ofori was loaned out to Danish Superliga club Vejle Boldklub until July 2022. On 15 June 2022, Ofori moved to Vejle on a permanent basis and signed a two-year contract.

International career
Ofori was called up to the Ghana national football team for the 2017 Africa Cup of Nations. He made his debut for Ghana in a 1–0 loss to Burkina Faso national football team on 4 February 2017. He scored in his second game for the Black Stars in an African Cup of Nations qualifier against Ethiopia.

International goals
Scores and results list Ghana's goal tally first.

Club statistics

Honours
VfB Stuttgart
 2. Bundesliga: 2016–17
Ghana U-20

 FIFA U-20 World Cup third place: 2013
 African U-20 Championship runner-up: 2013
Individual
 Swedish Allsvenskan Best midfielder: 2015

References

1995 births
Living people
Ghanaian footballers
Ghana international footballers
Ghanaian expatriate footballers
Ghana under-20 international footballers
Association football midfielders
2017 Africa Cup of Nations players
New Edubiase United F.C. players
AIK Fotboll players
VfB Stuttgart players
New York City FC players
Vejle Boldklub players
Allsvenskan players
2. Bundesliga players
Bundesliga players
Major League Soccer players
Danish Superliga players
Footballers from Kumasi
Ghanaian expatriate sportspeople in Sweden
Ghanaian expatriate sportspeople in Germany
Ghanaian expatriate sportspeople in the United States
Ghanaian expatriate sportspeople in Denmark
Expatriate footballers in Sweden
Expatriate footballers in Germany
Expatriate soccer players in the United States
Expatriate men's footballers in Denmark